The Polenz is the right-hand, smaller headstream of the Lachsbach in the German state of Saxony. Its lower course flows through the western Elbe Sandstone Mountains in a canyon-like valley.

Geography 
The springs are located southwest of the 461 m high Roubený (Raupenberg) mainly on German territory and unite at a height of 363 m above sea level. The upper reaches of the Polenz form the natural boundary between the forest land  and the Saxon Switzerland.

Tributaries 
The most important tributaries of the Polenz are the:
 Laubbach, Langburkersdorf
 Schluckenbach, Neustadt in Sachsen
 Lohbach, Neustadt in Sachsen
 Flemigbach, Polenz
 Rückersdorfer Bach, below Polenz
 Cunnersdorfer Bach, by the Bock Mill
 Goldflüßchen, at the Heeselicht Mill
 Bärenhohlflüßchen, above the Rußig Mill
 Schindergraben, at Hockstein
 Tiefergrundbach, at the Frinzthal Mill

See also 
List of rivers of Saxony

References 

Rivers of Saxony
Bodies of water of Saxon Switzerland
Hohnstein
Neustadt in Sachsen
Rivers of Germany